"Solitary Man" is a song that was written and composed by American musician Neil Diamond, who himself initially recorded the song for BANG Records in late January 1966. It has since been covered many times by such artists as Billy Joe Royal, B.J. Thomas, Jay and the Americans, T. G. Sheppard, Gianni Morandi, The Sidewinders, Chris Isaak, Johnny Cash, Johnny Rivers, HIM, Crooked Fingers, Cliff Richard, Ólöf Arnalds, Theuns Jordaan and Farhad Mehrad.

History
Recorded in late January 1966 and initially released on BANG Records in April 1966, "Solitary Man" was Diamond's debut single as a recording artist, having already had moderate (but accidental) success as a songwriter for other artists; their versions of the songs he had already written and composed were released before his own versions of them were. By July, the track had become a minor hit, rising to #55 on the U.S. pop singles chart. It would then be included on Diamond's first album, The Feel of Neil Diamond, which he released in August 1966.

The song is a "ballad of a loner looking for love."  While nominally about young romantic failure, lines in the lyrics that read:

have been closely identified with Diamond himself, as evinced by a 2008 profile in The Daily Telegraph: "This is the Solitary Man depicted on his first hit in 1966: the literate, thoughtful and melodically adventurous composer of songs that cover a vast array of moods and emotions..." Indeed, Diamond himself would tell interviewers in the 2000s, "After four years of Freudian analysis, I realized I had written 'Solitary Man' about myself."

"Solitary Man's" dynamic melody, matched with the melancholic universality of its lyrics, would make the song an attractive target for later interpretations.

After Diamond had renewed commercial success with Uni Records at the end of the decade, BANG Records re-released "Solitary Man" as a single and it reached No. 21 on the U.S. pop charts in the summer of 1970.  It also reached No. 6 on the Easy Listening chart.  Billboard praised the "solid dance beat and excellent production backing."

Diamond originally recorded two versions of the song, as he later did with "Cherry, Cherry." The one version had his harmonic vocal track on the refrain of the song, along with accompaniment by a wordless female chorus. The other version was him singing the song alone, without his prerecorded harmony or the female chorus.

On such live albums as Gold: Recorded Live at the Troubadour, Hot August Night, and some subsequent recordings, Diamond altered the lyrics to "then you came along" from the original "then Sue came along."  Many critics consider "Solitary Man" to be Diamond's signature tune.

In a 2005 Rolling Stone retrospective, Dan Epstein wrote, Solitary Man' remains the most brilliantly efficient song in the Diamond collection. There's not a wasted word or chord in this two-and-a-half minute anthem of heartbreak and self-affirmation, which introduced the melancholy loner persona that he's repeatedly returned to throughout his career."

Chart history

Notable cover versions

T. G. Sheppard version

In 1976, T. G. Sheppard released a cover version for Hitsville Records, a country-focused sub-label of Motown Records. It went to #14 on the U.S. country music chart (Hot Country Songs) and #100 on the Hot 100. The song charted best on the Canadian country chart, at No. 11.
It was also a hit on the Easy Listening charts of both nations.

Gianni Morandi version 
In 1966, famous Italian singer Gianni Morandi recorded a cover version titled "Se perdo anche te" ("If I also lose you"). The author of the Italian lyrics was Franco Migliacci, who was Morandi's producer at that time and who, eight years before, had written the lyrics to Domenico Modugno's international hit "Nel blu, dipinto di blu (Volare)."
This song was arranged by Ennio Morricone, who at that time conducted many tunes published by the Italian branch of the RCA Victor Records label, and was the B-Side of "C'era un ragazzo che come me amava i Beatles e i Rolling Stones," or "There was a boy who, like me, loved the Beatles and the Rolling Stones," a song against the Vietnam War.

The Sidewinders version 
The Tucson, Arizona alternative rock band The Sidewinders added a version of the song as the fifth track on their 1989 hit album Witchdoctor.

Chris Isaak version 

Chris Isaak covered "Solitary Man" as the last selection of his 1993 album San Francisco Days. The music video for Isaak's version of the song was directed by Larry Clark.

Johnny Cash version 

Johnny Cash used "Solitary Man" for the title track of his 3rd album under the American Recordings label, American III: Solitary Man, in 2000 featuring guest back vocals of Tom Petty. The recording received a Grammy Award for Best Male Country Vocal Performance. His recording of the song was used in the penultimate episode of Stargate Atlantis, "Vegas," and in the 17th episode of the fifth season of Criminal Minds. In Stargate Atlantis, the song was used twice during the same episode: the first time had the character, Detective John Shepard listening to it on the radio as he drove with a montage going, and the second was shortly before the credits, when Shepard apparently died. This recording was also used for the opening credits of the 2010 film Solitary Man, which starred Michael Douglas.

HIM version 

In 2004, Finnish band HIM covered "Solitary Man" for their first compilation album, And Love Said No: The Greatest Hits 1997–2004. It was released as a single, and Bam Margera produced a music video created for it. This cover peaked at No. 2 in Finland and became HIM's highest-charting single in the United Kingdom, reaching No. 9 on the UK Singles Chart

Track listings
Finnish and European version
 "Solitary Man" – 3:38
 "Please Don't Let It Go" (live) – 3:14
 "Join Me in Death" (live) – 4:59
 "Website extras included as Enhanced CD content"

UK DVD single
 "Solitary Man" (video) – 3:36
 "Right Here in My Arms" (video) – 3:30
 Bam Margera's making of Buried Alive By Love" – 1:58
 Pandora's slideshow – 4:00
 "Your Sweet 666" (audio—live 2003) – 4:40

UK CD single
 "Solitary Man"
 "Please Don't Let it Go" (punk rock version—live 2003)

UK 7-inch vinyl
 "Solitary Man"
 (Etched B-side contains no music)

Charts

Skin Flesh & Bones version 
Skin Flesh & Bones recorded a reggae cover of it on their 1974 7" release.

Tony Carey version 
Tony Carey covered "Solitary Man" on his album Only the Young Die Good and on the album The Boystown Tapes.

Jussi Syren and the Groundbreakers version 
Jussi Syren and the Groundbreakers  recorded a bluegrass version on their album Heartagrass - An Acoustic Tribute to HIM, a tribute to fellow Finnish performers HIM, whose version of the selection is described above.

References

External links
 

1966 songs
1966 singles
1970 singles
1993 singles
2000 singles
2004 singles
Songs written by Neil Diamond
Neil Diamond songs
Billy Joe Royal songs
Jay and the Americans songs
T. G. Sheppard songs
Johnny Cash songs
Chris Isaak songs
HIM (Finnish band) songs
Grammy Award for Best Male Country Vocal Performance winners
Bang Records singles
Reprise Records singles
Songs about infidelity
Songs about loneliness